The 1992 Indianapolis Tennis Classic was a women's tennis tournament played on indoor hard courts at the Indianapolis Racquet Club in Indianapolis, Indiana in the United States and was part of the Tier IV category of the 1992 WTA Tour. It was the 14th edition of the tournament and ran from November 9 through November 14, 1992. Fourth-seeded Katerina Maleeva won the singles title and earned $27,000 first-prize money.

Finals

Singles
 Helena Suková defeated  Linda Harvey-Wild 6–4, 6–3
 It was Suková's 2nd singles title of the year and the 10th of her career.

Doubles
 Katrina Adams /  Elna Reinach defeated  Sandy Collins /  Mary-Lou Daniels 5–7, 6–2, 6–4

References

External links
 ITF tournament edition details
 Tournament draws

Virginia Slims of Indianapolis
Virginia Slims of Indianapolis
Indianapolis Tennis Classic
Indianapolis Tennis Classic
Indianapolis Tennis Classic